Marumbi is a municipality in the state of Paraná in the Southern Region of Brazil.

See also
List of municipalities in Paraná
 Parque Nacional Marumbi or Parque Estadual do Pico do Marumbi

References

Municipalities in Paraná